The 2020 Big South men's basketball tournament was the postseason men's basketball tournament that ended the 2019–20 NCAA Division I men's basketball season of the Big South Conference. It was be held from March 3 through March 8, 2020 at various campus sites. The Winthrop Eagles received the automatic bid to the NCAA tournament after defeating Hampton 76–68 in the championship game.

Sites 
The first round was played at campus sites at the home of the higher seed. The quarterfinals and semifinals were played at the home of regular-season champion and No. 1 seed. The championship game was held at the home of the highest remaining seed after the semifinals.

Seeds
All 11 conference teams are eligible for the tournament. The top five teams receive a first-round bye. Teams are seeded by record within the conference, with a tiebreaker system to seed teams with identical conference records.

The tiebreakers operate in the following order:
 Head-to-head record.
 Record against the top-ranked conference team not involved in the tie, going down the standings until the tie is broken. For this purpose, teams with the same conference record are considered collectively. If two  teams were unbeaten or winless against an opponent but did not play the same number of games against that opponent, the tie is not considered broken.

Schedule

Bracket

References

External links
2020 Big South Men's Basketball Championship

Tournament
Big South Conference men's basketball tournament
Big South Conference men's basketball tournament
Big South Conference men's basketball tournament
Big South Conference men's basketball tournament